Demand-responsive transport (DRT), also known as demand-responsive transit, demand-responsive service, Dial-a-Ride transit (sometimes DART), flexible transport services, Microtransit or Non-Emergency Medical Transport (NEMT) is a form of shared private or quasi-public transport for groups traveling where vehicles alter their routes each journey based on particular transport demand without using a fixed route or timetabled journeys.  These vehicles typically pick-up and drop-off passengers in locations according to passengers needs and can include taxis, buses or other vehicles. Passengers can typically summon the service with a mobile phone app or by telephone; telephone is particularly relevant to older users who may not be conversant with technology.

One of the most widespread types of demand-responsive transport (DRT) is to provide a public transport service in areas of low passenger demand where a regular bus service is not considered to be financially viable, such as rural and peri-urban areas. Services may also be provided for particular types of passengers. One example is the paratransit programs for people with a disability. The provision of public transport in this manner emphasises one of its functions as a social service rather than creating a viable movement network.

Definition
DRT can be used to refer to many different types of transport. When taxicabs were first introduced to many cities, they were hailed as an innovative form of DRT. They are still referred to as DRT in some jurisdictions around the world as their very nature is to take people from point-to-point based on their needs.

More recently, DRT generally refers to a type of public transport. They are distinct from fixed-route services as they do not always operate to a specific timetable or route. While specific operations vary widely, generally a particular area is designated for service by DRT. Once a certain number of people have requested a trip, the most efficient route will then be calculated depending on the origins and destinations of passengers.

Share taxis are another form of DRT. They are usually operated on an ad hoc basis but also do not have fixed routes or times and change their route and frequency depending on demand.

Some DRT systems operate as a service that can deviate from a fixed route. These operate along a fixed alignment or path at specific times but may deviate to collect or drop off passengers who have requested the deviation.

Comparison of demand-responsiveness by type
Fully flexible route, fully flexible schedule, no booking – car, bike, foot

Shared vehicle
Fully flexible route, fully flexible schedule, booking – taxi
Fully flexible route, fully flexible schedule, no booking – hackney carriage taxi

Shared journey
highly flexible route, highly flexible schedule, mobile booking – microtransit
some degree of flexible route or schedule, no booking – share taxi/taxibus
some degree of flexible route or schedule, booking – paratransit
fixed route and fixed schedule, no booking – public transport

Operation

DRT services are restricted to a defined operating zone, within which journeys must start and finish. Journeys may be completely free form, or following skeleton routes and schedules, varied as required, with users given a specified pick-up point and a time window for collection. Some DRT systems may have defined termini, at one or both ends of a route, such as an urban centre, airport or transport interchange, for onward connections.

DRT systems require passengers to request a journey in advance. They may do this by booking with a central dispatcher who determines the journey options available given the user's location and destination. Increasingly, the booking is via an app, which provides the interface to software that creates a schedule in real time; adjusting the schedule to accept (or reject) bookings as they come in. This provides an instant decision for the potential user, but at the cost of efficiency: each individual travel need is considered individually, potentially resulting in higher levels of idle time (when the schedule has gaps that are too short to allow an additional journey to be added) and "dead mileage" (driving empty between one drop-off and the next pickup) than might be expected from a schedule built by an experienced human operator.

DRT systems take advantage of fleet telematics technology in the form of vehicle location systems, scheduling and dispatching software and hand-held/in vehicle computing.

Vehicles used for DRT services are typically small minibuses sufficient for low ridership, which allow the service to provide as near a door-to-door service as practical by using narrower residential streets. In some cases taxicabs are hired by the DRT provider to serve their routes on request.

DRT schemes may be fully or partially funded by the local transit authority, with operators selected by public tendering or other methods. Other schemes may be partially or fully self-funded as community centred not for profit social enterprises (such as a community interest company in the UK). They may also be provided by private companies for commercial reasons; some conventional bus operating companies have set up DRT-style airport bus services, which compete with larger private hire airport shuttle companies.

Health and environmental effects
DRT can potentially reduce the number of vehicles on the road, and hence pollution and congestion, if many people are persuaded to use it instead of private cars or taxis.

For a model of a hypothetical large-scale demand-responsive public transport system for the Helsinki metropolitan area, simulation results published in 2005 demonstrated that "in an urban area with one million inhabitants, trip aggregation could reduce the health, environmental, and other detrimental impacts of car traffic typically by 50–70%, and if implemented could attract about half of the car passengers, and within a broad operational range would require no public subsidies".

Licensing 

DRT schemes may require new or amended legislation, or special dispensation, to operate, as they do not meet the traditional licensing model of authorised bus transport providers or licensed taxicab operators. The status has caused controversy between bus and taxi operators when the DRT service picks up passengers without pre-booking, due to the licensing issues. Issues may also arise surrounding tax and fuel subsidy for DRT services.

Effectiveness 

Ridership on DRT services is usually quite low (less than ten passengers per hour), but DRT can provide coverage effectively.

Analysis of the Yorbus DRT scheme in a rural area of the UK showed very little combination of individual travel needs. Of the 35% of operating hours when the vehicles were carrying passengers, there was just one passenger (or a couple travelling together) for 74% of the time, and two passengers (or couples travelling together) for a further 20% of the time. The 15-seat minibuses could have been replaced by small taxis without capacity problems for 97% of the operating hours.

List of current DRT systems by country
Since the mid-2010s several DRT projects started up but failed.

In the US several DRT operators appeared and promptly failed, due to either lack of customers or health and safety issues. 2019 trials in London found that "satisfaction was really high"; users scored the service at 4.8/5 and praised ease of use, safety, cleanliness and accessibility. But low take-up, misunderstandings about who the service was for, and safety concerns about unlit stops—together with problems due to the covid pandemic from 2020—caused the trials to fail.

Lukas Foljanty, a shared-mobility enthusiast and market expert, keeps track of the different DRT schemes around the world and thinks a tipping point may have been reached in 2022. There were at least 450 schemes around the world, and in 2021 fifty-four new projects started within a three-month period.

David Carnero of Europe-wide DRT technology company Padam said that successful DRT requires subsidies, must be delivered at scale, and must be part of an integrated, rather than competitive, transport policy.

Australia 
 CoastConnect, first-mile / last-mile demand-responsive transport service in Woy Woy, New South Wales, operated by Community Transport Central Coast Limited and Liftango
 Kan-go, demand-responsive transport service in Hervey Bay, Queensland and Toowoomba, Queensland
 SmartLink, demand-responsive transport service in Blue Mountains.
 Skybus hotel transfer service in Melbourne, Victoria.
 Telebus in Melbourne, Victoria providing demand-responsive bus services to some outer suburbs of the metropolitan area since the 1970s.
 Flexiride in Melbourne, Victoria replaced Telebus services in 2021

Austria 
 RufbusLinie 326 Leopoldschlag – Summerau – Freistadt
W3 Shuttle

Belgium 
 Belbus — has been working since 1991 in the Flemish Region

Canada 
 Belleville, Ontario – BT Let's Go, operated by Belleville Transit, replaces fixed route night bus services with an on-demand transit service. This provides stop-to-stop scheduled pick-ups and drop-offs requested by riders through a web-based application. Buses are dynamically routed to riders in real-time by an autonomous algorithm.
Cobourg, Ontario – operated by Cobourg Transit, it plans to be a complete replacement of fixed route bus transit service, and will require residents to book a stop in advance. It is undergoing a pilot right now, and is scheduled to be fully implemented with the town's WHEELS transit service and replace fixed route transit on June 14, 2021.
 Edmonton, Alberta – Edmonton Transit Service offers On Demand Transit in designated areas not served by scheduled routes.
Guelph, Ontario – Works in addition to fixed route service.
Niagara Falls, Ontario – TransCab Service, operated by Niagara Falls Transit, provides service to the Montrose Junction section of the city during the daytime and early evening.
 Toronto, Ontario — Wheel-Trans
 Winnipeg, Manitoba – WT On-Request, operated by Winnipeg Transit, replaces regular fixed transit route service in three neighbourhoods during low-use hours and provides door-to-door transit service in one inner-city neighbourhood during daytime hours.

Czech Republic 

 Radiobus – has operated across the country since 2004. Since 2011, it has been part of the general public transport system to supplement the existing system during times of low demand. It uses fixed timetables, but vehicles only operate when called by passenger.
 DHD – has operated since 2003. Its primary purpose was for collecting workers from sparsely-populated rural areas. DHD provides bookings and administrative support, however, the buses themselves are operated by several local transport companies.

Denmark 
 Fynbus — provides door-to-door DRT service on the island of Funen

Finland 

 Akaa – Akaakyyti
 Inkoo – Inkyyti 
 Jakobstad – Vippari
 Porvoo – Kyläkyyti
 Riihimäki – R-kyyti
 Uusikaupunki – Ukikyyti

Germany 
 Berlin – Allygator Shuttle, Clevershuttle, BerlKönig
 Braunschweig, Lower Saxony – Anruflinien-Taxi (ALT) and Anruflinien-Bus (ALB) 
 Cologne – AnrufLinienFahrt (ALF), an on-demand minibus service that operates in predominantly rural areas of the city.
 Dresden – Anruf-Linien-Bus Verkehrsgesellschaft Meißen
 Duisburg – myBUS
 Elbe-Elster – Anruf-Linienbus, a DRT bus service operated by the regional public transport authority in Herzberg, Sonnewalde, Umland and Finsterwalde
 Freyung, Bavaria – FreyFahrt
Hamburg – MOIA
 Munich – IsarTiger
 Rostock – REBUS = Regional Bus Rostock
 Districts of Tirschenreuth, Neustadt an der Waldnaab and Schwandorf – Baxi, a mix between taxis and buses taking passengers from stops to any destination within the districts.

Hong Kong 
Red minibuses which serve non-franchised routes across the country, depending on routes, allow passengers to reserve their seats by phone such that operators and drivers are able to know where passengers are and how many there are in deploying their vehicles.

Iceland 
Public transport authority in the Icelandic capital of Reykjavik and the surrounding municipalities. Manages public bus transport and disabled transport, but does not have its own vehicles. About 1300 enquiries and thousand trips a day. Uses 60 vehicles and 10–20 more for school transport for children with special needs.

Italy 
Following some pioneering DRT schemes implemented in the 1980s, a second wave of systems were launched from the mid-1990s. There are now DRT schemes in urban and peri-urban areas as well as in rural communities. Operated by both public transport companies and private service providers, the DRT schemes are offered either as intermediate collective transport services for generic users or as schemes for specific user groups. DRT schemes operate in major cities including Rome, Milan, Genoa, Florence, and in several mid- to small-size towns including Alessandria, Aosta, Cremona, Livorno, Mantova, Parma, Empoli, Siena, and Sarzana.

 AllôBus and AllôNuit, demand-responsive transport service in Aosta/Aoste
 DrinBus, demand-responsive transport service in Genoa
 PersonalBus, demand-responsive transport service in Florence
 ProntoBus, demand-responsive transport service in Livorno and Sarzana
 EccoBus, demand-responsive transport service in Alessandria
 StradiBus, demand-responsive transport service in Cremona
 Radiobus, demand-responsive transport service in Milan

Japan 

More than 200 of the 1700 local governments in Japan have introduced DRT public transport services.

Luxembourg 
 Flexibus – several Flexibus services operate in different parts of the country. The system operates on the basis of passengers calling a central point from which optimal routes for the vehicles are calculated.
 Kussbus – private door-to-door bus service primarily for commuter purposes.

New Zealand 
 MyWay in Timaru, a replacement of the usual bus service with demand-responsive transport service.

Poland 
The first ever demand-responsive transport scheme in Poland – called Tele-Bus – has been operated since 2007 in Krakow by MPK, the local public transport company (see also Tramways in Krakow).

Russia 

 ″Po puti″, or On The Way, is the first ever demand-responsive transport scheme in Russia. Launched on October 1, 2021 and operated by Mosgortrans, it serves two zones in NAO and TAO, Moscow (both often referred to as ″ТиНАО″ in Russian). Zone 1 includes Filimonkovskoye, Sosenskoye, Desyonovskoye and Voskresenskoye Settlements with the Prokshino metro station. Zone 2a, introduced on November 1, 2021, includes Ryazanovskoye Settlement with the Silikatnaya railway station, Line D2. Starting from December 24, 2021, the Shcherbinka railway station, also D2, was added to zone 2a, whereas zone 1 was expanded by adding more blocks of Filimonkovskoye Settlement and southern areas of Desyonovskoye Settlement. Further enlargement is announced.

Sweden 
Regional transport authority in Västra Götaland in southwestern Sweden is responsible for all public transport and for transport offers to citizens with special needs. This is an example of DRT used for people with special needs (paratransit).

Switzerland 
DRT services have operated in some sparsely populated areas (under 100 p/km2) since 1995. PostBus Switzerland Ltd, the national post company, has operated a DRT service called PubliCar, formerly also Casa Car.

United Kingdom 
Some DRT schemes were operating under the UK bus-operating regulations of 1986, allowed by having core start and finish points and a published schedule. Regulations concerning bus service registration and application of bus-operating grants for England and Wales were amended in 2004 to allow registration of fully flexible pre-booked DRT services. Some services, such as LinkUp, only pick up passengers at 'meeting points', but can set down at the passenger's destination.

The Greenwich Association of the Disabled had earlier developed a prototype service, GAD-About, which offered pre-booked door-to-door transport for its members, inspired by similar minibus usage in church and youth clubs. That was then cloned as an easily scalable module, under the aegis of London Transport, to become the Dial-a-Ride service launched as part the general services of Transport for London (TfL), rather than as a bus service.

Connecting Communities / Suffolk Links (Suffolk)
Demand Responsive Transport (Aberfoyle)
Fox Connect (Leicestershire), ran by National Express Group).
Go2  (Sevenoaks), DRT services implemented during the COVID-19 pandemic with app provided by ViaVan.
Indiego Plus (Warwick)
Kent Karrier (Kent)
MK Connect (Milton Keynes)
Novus Flex (Leicestershire), ran by Vectare.
Ring'n'Ride (Strathclyde)
Slide Bristol  (real-time service by Padam)
Surrey Connect Mole Valley Digital DRT service launched in 2021 covering the Mole Valley area. Service put in place by Surrey County Council with Padam Mobility and a community transport operator.
ArrivaClick (Kent, Watford and Speke)
Connect2Wiltshire (Wiltshire)
Dengie DaRT 99, connecting passengers from the Maldon district with Broomfield and St Peter's Hospitals
Fflecsi, (Wales), DRT services implemented during the COVID-19 pandemic with app provided by ViaVan, and co-ordinated by Transport for Wales.
Herts Lynx (Stevenage, Buntingford, Royston, and the surrounding towns and villages which don't have good transport/bus coverage. The digital DRT solution was put in place by Hertfordshire County Council with Padam Mobility and Uno a commercial bus operator.
CallConnect (Lincolnshire)
LinkUp (Tyne & Wear) (Closed 2011)
London Dial-a-Ride
Nippy Bus (Somerset)
Scarborough Dial A Ride (North Yorkshire)
West Midlands On Demand (Coventry, Leamington Spa, Warwick Parkway, and the surrounding villages which don't have good bus connection.

United States 
thumb|Dial a Ride in New Jersey, 1974

The large majority of 1,500 rural systems in the US provide demand-response service; there are also about 400 urban DRT systems.

California 
 Demand-Responsive Van Service,
 Demand-Response Shuttle, Don Edwards San Francisco Bay National Wildlife Refuge
 Demand-Responsive Transit, Redwood National and State Parks

Colorado 
 Call-n-Ride service, Regional Transportation District, Denver

Florida 
 Flex Service, Votran, New Smyrna Beach
 NeighborLink, Lynx, Central Florida
 SNAP, UF Transportation and Parking Services, Gainesville

Illinois 
 Call-n-Ride, Pace Bus, Chicago metropolitan area
 Safe Rides, Champaign-Urbana Mass Transit District, Champaign-Urbana metropolitan area (evening and overnight service only)

Maryland 
Ride On Flex, Ride On, Montgomery County

New York 
 Access-A-Ride, Metropolitan Transportation Authority, New York City
 Bee-Line Paratransit, Bee-Line Bus System, Westchester County

North Carolina 
 Dial-A-Ride, GWTA, Goldsboro
Flex Service, Greenway Transit, Taylorsville & Burke County. Hybrid of fixed & on-demand.
Night Shuttle, Tar River Transit, Rocky Mount
Qualla Community Resident Transportation, Cherokee Transit, Jackson County. Hybrid of fixed & on-demand.
Rural General Public Service, MTS, Charlotte metropolitan area
Trailblazer Routes, BCMM, Asheville metropolitan area. Hybrid of fixed & on-demand.

Pennsylvania 
 Flex Connect, Ponono Pony, Monroe County. Only designated stops.

South Carolina 
 Tel-A-Ride, CARTA, Charleston

Tennessee 

 Ready!, MATA, Memphis
 Groove, Memphis

Texas 
 GoLink, DART, Dallas area

Virginia 

 Care and Care Plus, GRTC, Greater Richmond Region

Washington State 
 Zone Service and Flex Service, Whatcom Transportation Authority, Whatcom County
 Dial-a-Ride Transit, Community Transit, Snohomish County
 Metro Access, King County Metro, King County
 Finley Service, Ben Franklin Transit, Tri-Cities, Washington

Washington, DC 
 MetroAccess, WMATA, Washington, DC

See also 
 Hail and ride
 Microtransit
 Open data
 Paratransit
 Share taxi
 Route assignment
 Wardrop equilibrium

References 

 
Types of bus service